Combat Hospital is a medical drama television series, filmed in Toronto, that debuted on Global in Canada and ABC in the United States on June 21, 2011. Its final episode was broadcast on September 6, 2011. The series was known for a time by the working title The Hot Zone before reverting to the original title, Combat Hospital.

ABC announced on October 24, 2011, that it would not be renewing Combat Hospital for a second season. On December 16, 2011, Shaw Media confirmed that Combat Hospital would not be renewed for another season due to their inability to find a new broadcast partner after ABC opted not to continue with the series earlier that fall.

Plot
Set in Kandahar, Afghanistan in 2006, the series revolves around the life and work of doctors and nurses from the International Security Assistance Force, specifically from Canada, the United States, the United Kingdom, Australia, Germany, and other allied countries at a military hospital.

Cast

Main cast
 Michelle Borth as Canadian Forces Medical Officer, Major Rebecca Gordon, Canadian Army
 Elias Koteas as Canadian Forces Medical Officer, Commanding Officer Colonel Xavier Marks, Canadian Army (based on Major Marc Dauphin)
 Terry Chen as United States Army Captain (Doctor) Bobby Trang, trauma team leader
 Arnold Pinnock as Canadian Forces Nursing Officer, Chief of Nursing, Commander Will Royal, Royal Canadian Navy
 Deborah Kara Unger as Australian Army psychiatrist, Major Grace Pedersen
 Luke Mably as British contract neurosurgeon, Doctor Simon Hill
 Ali Kazmi as Chaplain David Nedayal

Recurring cast
 Ellen Wong as Canadian Forces Nursing Officer, Major Suzy Chao, Canadian Army
 Hamza Jeetooa as Vans, Afghan translator
 Gord Rand as Canadian Forces Medical Technician, Regimental Sergeant-Major, Chief Warrant Officer Graham Kelly, Canadian Army
 Karan Oberoi as United States Air Force Pararescue Jumper, Talwar Mehra
 Dwain Murphy as United States Air Force Pararescue Jumper, Terrel Ford
 Husein Madhavji as United States Air Force Lieutenant Colonel Max Prakash, Orthopedic Surgeon
 Adam Beach as Snake Eater/Joe
 Trenna Keating as Sgt. Hannah Corday
 Sam Kalilieh as Dr. Tarzi
 Lisa Berry as Capt. Pam Everwood, RN

Production
Jinder Oujla-Chalmers came up with the concept for Combat Hospital in 2008 and, together with Douglas Steinberg, pitched the show to Canwest (now Shaw Media). After the show was picked up for development, Oujla-Chalmers travelled to Afghanistan to conduct first-hand research at a small, forward-deployed military hospital. Oujla-Chalmers was able to use real images taken during the visit and stories heard from medical personnel to add realism to the show. Oujla-Chalmers and Steinberg brought the show to Sienna Films, who agreed to produce it and set up funding as a Canadian-British co-production with Artists Studio and Lookout Point in the UK.

Canwest announced on July 9, 2010, that Combat Hospital was slated for production in the 2011–12 season. The budget for the first season was reported to be $2 million per episode. During pre-production, Morocco was considered as a location for filming the series. Production on the series began in March 2011. The series was filmed at the former Consumers Glass factory in Etobicoke, Ontario. The property had been converted into a 17,187 square metre indoor/outdoor set that recreated portions of the NATO Role 3 Hospital at Kandahar Airfield, as well as its surroundings. Filming was scheduled to continue until July 27, 2011. Post-production work was done in London. The first season has 13 episodes.

Broadcast
Combat Hospital was broadcast in Canada on Global. Throughout its initial broadcast the series was consistently performing better than CTV's Flashpoint and Global's Rookie Blue, it was often the most watched scripted programme of the week in Canada. While only the twelfth episode was shown in the U.S. on August 30 both the eleventh and twelfth episodes were shown in Canada. In September 2011, Shaw Media began repeating the series on both Showcase and Showcase Diva.

On December 16, while filming the New Year's Day special of Royal Canadian Air Farce, cast member Arnold Pinnock confirmed that Shaw Media had cancelled Combat Hospital as they were faced with the inability to find another broadcast partner to offset the expenses of the show.

International distribution
In early January 2011 ABC was in talks to purchase broadcast rights to the then-untitled project. Later, on January 20, 2011, it was reported that ABC had indeed purchased broadcast rights to the project. On March 25, 2011, Shaw Media announced that the series would be simulcast in the United States by ABC.  On August 24, 2011, ABC announced that they were skipping the eleventh episode of season 1 and moving the season finale date by one week, from September 13, 2011, to September 6, 2011. ABC announced on October 24, 2011, that they would not be commissioning a second season of Combat Hospital.

Outside of North America the series was distributed by Sony Pictures Television.

Combat Hospital was shown in Hungary on PRO4 starting on April 1, 2012. In July 2013, it was shown in Catalonia on TV3 as Hospital de campanya.

Episodes

Reception
Overall, the series received mixed to negative reviews. John Doyle of The Globe and Mail said that the show is neither the new M*A*S*H for its lack of "snarky chat about the stupidity of war and governments that encourage war" nor is it Grey's Anatomy-on-the-front-lines as there are no "lurid romantic entanglements". Doyle goes on to say, "It's the horrors of war and the awfulness of a combat hospital seen emphatically through the prism of TV drama." In concluding his review Doyle said, "In the matter of Afghanistan and military life there, if you want a gruelling experience, watch the news. Combat Hospital is the entertaining version."

Matthew Gilbert of The Boston Globe found the show "is completely divorced from anything resembling real life." He said the premise is "exciting and, to some extent, incendiary" but that with "amateurish acting and paint-by-numbers writing" Combat Hospital and Rookie Blue "are summer filler of the laziest kind."

David Wiegard of the San Francisco Chronicle found Combat Hospital "makes a pretty compelling attempt" at portraying "the bloody reality of war" while also having all of the typical characters of a medical drama.

DVD releases
Sony Pictures Home Entertainment released Combat Hospital on DVD in the United States on March 6, 2012, as part of their manufacture-on-demand service. It is not available for purchase in Canada.

Mill Creek Entertainment announced the re-released of the series on DVD.

See also

References

External links
 

2010s Canadian drama television series
2011 Canadian television series debuts
2011 Canadian television series endings
American Broadcasting Company original programming
2010s Canadian medical television series
Global Television Network original programming
English-language television shows
Canadian military television series
Television series by Sony Pictures Television
Television series by Corus Entertainment
Television shows filmed in Toronto
Television shows set in Afghanistan
War in Afghanistan (2001–2021) in popular culture